Camp Hansen is a United States Marine Corps base located in Okinawa, Japan. The camp is situated in the town of Kin, near the northern shore of Kin Bay, and is the second-northernmost major installation on Okinawa, with Camp Schwab to the north. The camp houses approximately 6,000 Marines nowadays, and is part of Marine Corps Base Camp Butler, which itself is not a physical base and comprises all Marine Corps installations on Okinawa.

Camp Hansen is named for Medal of Honor recipient Dale M. Hansen, a Marine Corps private who was honored for his heroism in the fight for Hill 60 during the Battle of Okinawa.  Hansen was killed by a Japanese sniper's bullet three days after his actions on Hill 60.

Built on the site of the former Chimu Airfield, the Camp was completed on 20 September 1965 after 29 months of construction by USN Mobile Construction Battalions 3, 9, and 11.

Tenant units
 Headquarters, 12th Marine Regiment
 3rd Battalion 12th Marines
 3rd Law Enforcement Battalion
 3rd Intelligence Battalion
 7th Communication Battalion
 31st Marine Expeditionary Unit
 5th Air Naval Gunfire Liaison Company (ANGLICO)
 9th Engineer Support Battalion
 Special Operations Training Group
 Elements of the 3rd Reconnaissance Battalion.
 3rd Marine Division Truck Company
 III MEF Information Group (MIG)
 2nd Battalion 11th Marines
3rd Ordnance Maintenance Company (OMC)

Base information

The base is home to the Central Training Area, which includes several firing ranges, a pair of shooting houses which support live fire training, and other training areas, being one of the few locations on the island where weapons firing is permitted. Also located at Camp Hansen is a brig, a confinement facility that houses U.S. military members from around the Far East for short term sentences.

Facilities include a Post Exchange, a theater, a convenience store, two gyms, and a "consolidated entertainment facility" known as The Palms, which has two restaurants, as well as enlisted, SNCO, and officer clubs.

In March 2008, the Japan Ground Self-Defense Force began training at Camp Hansen, as part of the reorganization of U.S. forces in Japan and the move towards sharing facilities between American and Japanese troops.

Controversies
In September 1995, three U.S. servicemen stationed in Camp Hansen rented a van, kidnapped and raped a 12-year-old Japanese girl. The crime "stirred furor" among the Okinawans, according to Time.

According to documents leaked by Edward Snowden and published by The Intercept, the site hosts an NSA collection facility codenamed CAMELUS. It uses a PUSHER-type antenna.

See also

List of U.S. Marine Corps bases

References

External links

 
 An Insider's Guide to USMC Bases

Hansen
Installations of the U.S. Department of Defense in Japan
United States Armed Forces in Okinawa Prefecture